Lewis Alexander Paul Niven (born 3 May 1988) is a former Scottish rugby union player who played for Edinburgh Rugby in the Pro12.

Background
He made his first start against Cardiff Blues at Murrayfield in the Heineken Cup in January 2011, and his first Magners League start on the visit to Scarlets the following month. The prop, who was part of the Scotland 'A' squad at the IRB Nations Cup in June 2010, has long been tipped for a career at the top and received the prestigious John Macphail scholarship in 2009. The award, which enabled Niven to spend a summer playing club rugby in Auckland, has traditionally been a stepping stone to further honours and Niven's arrival at Edinburgh is the first step in that process.

Niven, who was in the Trinity Academy first XV for three seasons before progressing to Edinburgh Accies, played at tighthead in all of Scotland's matches in the 2008 under-20 Six Nations Championship. He made his debut in the France game at Falkirk, and scored a try against England at the same venue. In June 2008, he played in three games in the IRB Junior World Championship in Wales. He represented Edinburgh at under-18 level before winning national recognition at that level in the Home Unions' 2006 under-18 tournament, staged in Gloucestershire.  In 2007, he played for Scotland in the IRB under-19 world championship in Belfast and was a member of Accies' squad for the Scottish Hydro Electric Cup Final against Glasgow Hawks.

References 

1988 births
Living people
Edinburgh Rugby players
Scottish rugby union players
Rugby union props